The Asiatic Lion Reintroduction Project is an initiative of the Indian Government to provide safeguards to the Asiatic lion (Panthera leo leo) from extinction in the wild by means of reintroduction. The last wild population of the Asiatic lion is found in the region of Gir Forest National Park, in the state of Gujarat. The single population faces the threats of epidemics, natural disasters and other anthropogenic factors. The project aims to establish a second independent population of Asiatic lions at the Kuno National Park in the Indian state of Madhya Pradesh. However, the proposed translocation has been bitterly contested by the state government.

History

The distribution of Asiatic lion, once found widely in West and South Asia, dwindled to a single population in the Gir Forest National Park and Wildlife Sanctuary in India. The population at Gir declined to 18 animals in 1893 but increased due to protection and conservation efforts to 284 in 1994. The Gir Wildlife Sanctuary is now highly overpopulated with lions, the 2015 census showed the strength to be 523 lions. There are numerous deaths in the population annually because of ever increasing competition between the human and animal overcrowding. Asiatic lion prides require large territories but there is limited space at Gir wildlife sanctuary, which is boxed in on all sides by heavy human habitation. Gir lions have started moving outwards from the sanctuary and establishing homes outside the protected areas.

Sheopur introduction of 1904
The Maharaja of Gwalior, on being encouraged by Lord Curzon in 1904, imported cubs of African lions and attempted to introduce them in the wild in the forests near Sheopur. The introduced lions took to raiding livestock and some even turned to man-eating, subsequent to which they were all eventually tracked down and shot.

The Chandraprabha relocation of 1957
The concept of reintroduction for purposes of conservation was accepted in 1956 by the Indian Wildlife Board during a meeting of their executive committee at Sasan Gir and the offer by the state government of Uttar Pradesh to host a second population in the Chakia forests was accepted. In 1956 one lion and two lionesses were captured from Gir, placed in the Sakkarbuagh Zoo in Junagadh for nine months and then translocated in 1957 to the  Chandra Prabha Sanctuary,  near Varanasi in Uttar Pradesh and newly established for the reintroduction. Initially the lions prospered increasing in number to four in 1958, five in 1960, seven in 1962 and eleven in 1965 after which the population died out inexplicably.

Johnsingh (2006) attributes the failure of the translocation to three causes – inadequate area, lack of systematic monitoring using scientific techniques and unrestricted movement of grazing animals throughout the sanctuary possibly leading to conflict with herders. Small size of area, the long period of captivity in Junagadh zoo, absence of education of the local villagers and lack of conflict resolution mechanisms are also listed as contributory factors in Chellam and Johnsingh (1999).

The Wildlife Institute of India initiative
The Wildlife Institute of India (WII) began studying the Asiatic lion in its habitat in from 1986 onwards and collected fundamental data about the lion, its feeding, use of habitat and ranging habits. In 1990, the WII proposed the creation of a second wild population of Asiatic lions to safeguard the species against potential calamities in Gujarat's Gir National Park.

Project Lion 
Project Lion is an Indian government initiative to conserve the Asiatic lion species that was announced on 15 August 2020 during the 74th independence day celebrations by Indian prime minister Narendra Modi. It will be under the Ministry of Environment, Forest and Climate Change and is modelled on the lines of Project Tiger. The project has established three "gene pool" sites at Rampara in Saurashtra, and Sakkarbaug and Satveerada in Junagadh for the purpose of breeding the lions. One of the aims of the project is to address human-wildlife conflict between local residents and the lions. The project has also identified six new potential sites of reintroduction of the species in the country.

The six new potential sites are:

 Madhav National Park, Madhya Pradesh
 Sitamata Wildlife Sanctuary, Rajasthan
 Mukundra Hills Tiger Reserve, Rajasthan
 Gandhi Sagar Wildlife Sanctuary, Madhya Pradesh
 Kumbhalgarh Wildlife Sanctuary, Rajasthan
 Jessore-Balaram Ambaji WLS and adjoining landscape, Gujarat

1993 PHVA report
In 1993, a workshop was held on the Population and Habitat Viability Assessment (PHVA) of Asiatic lion and the report was presented to the state forest departments in Vadodara, Gujarat. State forest departments were asked to suggest suitable sites for reintroduction and provide the basic ecological data.

During the workshop, a number of teams were formed to focus on varied aspects of the conservation biology of the Asiatic lion such as monitoring, habitat (further subdivided into Gujarat, Madhya Pradesh and Rajasthan sub-groups), population modelling, prey-base requirements, lion-human interactions, translocation, captive zoo animals, public education, veterinary, reproductive and genetic aspects etc.

The sites were assessed and ranked for suitability as follows:
 Kuno Wildlife Sanctuary - found most suitable for reintroduction.
 Sita Mata Wildlife Sanctuary - later rejected due to human interference and inadequate prey population.
 Darrah - Jawahar Sagar Wildlife Sanctuary - later rejected due to degraded habitat and unsuitable geography.
 Kumbhalgarh Wildlife Sanctuary - assessed as having limited area, unsuitable terrain, limited water and prey base as well as disturbance.
 Barda Wildlife Sanctuary - assessed as having scarcity of water, prey and forage, as well as encroachment and disturbance.

The PHVA report strongly favoured the scientific management of reintroduction of Asiatic lions to another site:

The PHVA deliberations were followed by visits to the three most promising site, viz Kuno, Darrah-Jawaharsagar and Sitamata WLS by a survey team of WII headed by Dr Ravi Chellam. The team evaluated sites over various parameters and compared the same with respect to Gir Forest for determining the suitability of sites. They presented their findings in 1995 to the Government of India and the state forest departments. WII researchers confirmed that the Palpur-Kuno Wildlife Sanctuary was the most promising location to re-establish a free ranging population of the Asiatic lions and in 2007 certified it ready to receive its first batch of translocated lions.

Project framework
The framework of the Lion Introduction Project emerged from the transformation of a Monitoring Committee, set up by the Government of India, which met on 10 March 2004 for effective implementation of the reintroduction at Kuno.

At the meeting the WII Site Survey was examined and it was understood that Kuno Palpur Sanctuary was the most suitable site for reintroduction. The Committee formulated a three phase framework for the conservation project to last for two decades as follows : 
 During the first phase, slated from 1995-2000, the 24 villages would be shifted out of the sanctuary and the habitat would be improved.
 The second phase would last from 2000 to 2005 and would include fencing off of the lion reintroduction site, the actual trans-location, as well as research and monitoring.
 The final phase III would last from 2005 to 2015 and would focus on eco-development of the region.

At that point in time, the project was in Phase II and 18 of the 24 villages had been rehabilitated from Kuno. The refusal of Gujarat state to provide lions was mentioned during this meeting by the Chief Wildlife Warden of Gujarat. A number of steps were approved with consensus which included the engaging of the Gujarat State Government as to the necessity of the project, preparation of a trans-location road map, fresh assessment of prey base of Kuno by WII and continued funding support for welfare measures and habitat improvement for the existing fauna at Kuno.

Lion reintroduction at Kuno National Park

Establishing the wildlife sanctuary
The Madhya Pradesh state forest department notified  of the Kuno Palpur area as a Wildlife Sanctuary in 1981.

Rehabilitation of villagers
Twenty four villages of the Sahariya tribe, comprising 1545 families, were moved out from the core area and rehabilitated by the state government with assistance from the Central Government. By 2002-2003, all 24 villages and the identified families were relocated outside Kuno and the former village area converted into grasslands.

The net outflow to the Central Government was Rs.15 crores.

Major gaps remain in the implementation of the rehabilitation measures, with villagers alleging that they have got little of the rehabilitation package they were promised. The negative economic impact of the displacement to villagers from Kuno sanctuary has raised a controversy over the merits of species preservation via dislocation of human populations living inside Protected Areas. NGOs, such as the Samrakshan Trust, have been working for better rehabilitation of villagers who agreed to move out of the Kuno Wildlife Sanctuary.

Opposition by the Gujarat Government
In 2004, the state government refused to part with the first pride of 19 animals planned for relocation. The state considers the lions as "heritage of the state" and the issue of handing over lions has become a political issue.  Mangubhai Patel, then State Forest Minister, went on record to state that: 

As early as 2009, the continued opposition of the Gujarat state government led to the Madhya Pradesh Forest Department's exploration of the possibility of procuring zoo-bred Asiatic lions and shifting them and their descendants to Palpur-Kuno.

The Gujarat state government has, over time, made various arguments against translocating lions to Madhya Pradesh (MP), such as that the Kuno sanctuary was not suitable lion habitat and that it had inadequate prey base, that MP had been unable to provide adequate protection to tigers in its Panna National Park and the lions if reintroduced there would be in danger, that the proposed introduction of Southern African cheetahs to Kuno rendered it unsuitable for lion reintroduction.

The Gujarat State Wildlife Department proposed new homes for lions in the Barda Wildlife Sanctuary and Bhavnagar Amreli Forest instead. Gir's lions have spread beyond the protective area and the measures of the state to engage this phenomenon are being portrayed as providing adequate dispersal to the lion population to prevent disease. Gujarat also played an emotional card by declaring before the Supreme Court that the lion was inextricably bound to the culture of Gujarat and that it was a "family member", hence could not be provided for translocation to Kuno.

This stand of Gujarat suffered a setback when on 15 April 2013, the Supreme Court of India acknowledged translocation to Kuno as being in the best interest of the species and rejected the Gujarat Government's objections, instead ordering the translocation to be carried out within six months.  A bandh was called in the villages adjoining the Sasan Gir region on 18 April 2013 protesting the Supreme Court decision.

Supreme Court verdict and aftermath
In light of the State Government of Gujarat's refusal to permit the reintroduction of Asiatic lions, a writ petition was filed in 1995 by the Centre for Environment Law and WWF-I in the Indian Supreme Court to get the Gujarat State Government to release a few prides of Asiatic lions for the Kuno Wildlife Sanctuary. The Indian Supreme Court fast-tracked the case and delivered a judgement on 16 April 2013 permitting the reintroduction of lions to Kuno, over-ruling the objections of the Gujarat Government.

The Gujarat Government filed on 1 July 2013 for a review in the Supreme Court of its 16 April ruling. In its petition, the Gujarat state government claimed that "top carnivores have never been successfully translocated".
The state has put forward the argument that translocation would break social bonds between members of groups or prides, which are vital for lion survival. The reported presence of tiger cubs in Palpur-Kuno was emphasised, saying that it could result in conflict between these top predators. The state proposed, instead, a second home for lions within Gujarat itself, claiming it would have numerous advantages including being in tune with international guidelines. 
The continued reluctance of the state to part with lions for translocation has come under criticism from prominent environmentalists.

Post the verdict, fears have been voiced by Gujarati environmentalists over the gun culture of Madhya Pradesh and number of firearms in Sheopur, the region where the Kuno Palpur sanctuary is located and it is suggested that translocation to such an area would be in violation of IUCN norms on the subject. With the release of IUCN guidelines on translocation, opponents of the project have cited from the provisions and also claimed that the history of translocations especially in India is dismal and hence translocation is not favoured.

2014
The Gujarat government's curative petition against relocation of the wild Asiatic lions from the Gir Forest to Madhya Pradesh was dismissed by the Supreme Court on 14 August 2014.

In the face of continued opposition, the Madhya Pradesh government is considering an alternate plan to release zoo-bred lions from Hyderabad and Sakkarbaug, a move which has been criticised in the light of the deaths of two newly translocated zoo-bred lions in the safari park at Etawah, Uttar Pradesh.

After the dismissal of the Gujarat State petition, two NGOs from Gujarat have filed separate petitions against the translocation order, one on the grounds that certain relevant facts have not been brought to the notice of the apex court, the other stating that the importance of Kuno-Palpur as a corridor for migrating tigers between Ranthambore National Park in Rajasthan and Madhav National Park in Madhya Pradesh had been downplayed.

2017
As of December 2017, Madhya Pradesh still has not received lions from Gujarat. For this reason, it may have given up on trying to acquire them.

2018
As of October 2018, the lions were still in Gujarat, and 23 of them were found dead. 4 of them had died of canine distemper virus, which killed 1,000 East African lions in the Serengeti ecoregion.

Translocation plan within Gujarat
The plan is to reintroduce a pride or two of wild, free-ranging Asiatic lions from Gir Forest in the neighboring Indian state of Gujarat to start with.

In compliance with the Supreme Court order of 15 April 2013, the Ministry of Environment and Forests has constituted a panel for deciding the best course of action in translocation of animals to Gir. The panel comprises 12 members including member secretary National Tiger Conservation Authority, the Chief Wildlife Wardens of Gujarat and Madhya Pradesh, member Wildlife Institute of India, and scientists Drs Ravi Chellam, Y.V. Jhala, NK Ranjeet Singh and PR Sinha. The panel will advice both the states on technical aspect of translocation, decide the composition of animals to be translocated, select the prides and animals, supervise the translocation, monitor it and periodically report to the Ministry. During the first deliberations on 29 July 2013, the panel acceded the need to follow the recent IUCN translocation guidelines but brushed aside Gujarat's objections against the process. A two-member team comprising Dr Ravi Chellam and Dr Y.V. Jhala has been set up to decide the translocation protocol and report within six weeks.

Gujarat objected to meeting of the 12-member panel on 29 July 2013 before its petition had been reviewed and also to the presence of tiger experts on the panel, claiming that lion experts from Gujarat had been ignored, however that petition was rejected by the Supreme Court.

This is the first time that the Government of India has accepted that the sanctuary needs to be enlarged. However, the expansion would require the relocation of several big villages, a move the Madhya Pradesh government is not keen to undertake. The Madhya Pradesh Forest Department is of the view that the present sanctuary area and its buffer total over 700 km2 and are therefore adequate, but have made no mention of notifying the buffer zone area also as a sanctuary.

In a reversal of position, the Ministry of Environment and Forests decided in a meeting in June 2015 against translocation at present on the grounds that it would be detrimental to the breeding and survival of the lions as they lived in social prides. The turn-around of stance has been attributed by environmentalists supporting the translocation to Narendra Modi who had as Chief Minister of Gujarat stated that the lion was the pride of Gujarat and had publicly declared his opposition to the transfer of lions outside the state.

See also
 Wildlife conservation
 Reintroduction
 in-situ conservation
 Ex-situ conservation
 List of Protected areas in India
 International Union for Conservation of Nature (IUCN)
 Extinction
 Indian Council of Forestry Research and Education
 Iran's Project Lion
 Cheetah reintroduction in India

Notes

References

External links
 Information on Asiatic lion and Gir Forest at the website of Asiatic Lion Protection Society (ALPS)
 Aaj Tak Video News Report (in Hindi). Available on YouTube: Gir lions in Palpur Kuno Sanctuary - Report by Rajesh badal.mp4 by Rajesh Badal. Uploaded on Feb 14, 2011.

 
Wildlife conservation in India
Conservation projects
Animal reintroduction
Mammals of India
Panthera leo leo